Hajdú and Hajdu may refer to:

 Hajdu, mercenary soldiers in 16th- and 17th-century Hungary
 Hajdú (county), a historical county in the Kingdom of Hungary
 Hajdú-Bihar, a modern county in eastern Hungary
 Hajdu–Cheney syndrome, an extremely rare genetic disorder of the connective tissue
 Hajdú, a surname:
 Andre Hajdu (1932–2016), Israeli composer born in Hungary
 David Hajdu (born 1955), American columnist
 Étienne Hajdú (1907–1996), Transylvania-born French sculptor
 Georg Hajdu (born 1960), German composer and music theorist
 Markéta Hajdu (born 1974), Czech hammer thrower
 Patty Hajdu (born 1966), Canadian politician